Tarun Khanna is an Indian television and film actor who works in Hindi and Punjabi films.

Personal life 
Khanna is married to fellow television actress Smriti Khanna. They have a son who was born in 2014.

Media 
Moving almost entirely to taking up roles in mythological and fantasy shows, in an interview in 2013 Khanna admitted to finding daily soaps "stupid and badly written". In a 2015 interview, he repeated that there was a need for better writing in Indian television.

Filmography

Films

Television

References

External links
 
 

Living people
Indian male models
Male actors from Delhi
Indian male film actors
Indian male television actors
Male actors in Hindi television
21st-century Indian male actors
Year of birth missing (living people)